Szentesi Vízilabda Klub, a.k.a. Hungerit-Metalcom Szentesi for sponsorship reasons, is a Hungarian water polo club from Szentes. Founded in 1934, it is best known for its women's team, which won the 1993 European Cup and subsequently won a record seven national championships in a row.

Titles
 LEN Women's Champions' Cup
 Winner (1): 1993
 Hungarian First League
 Winner (11) - record: 1987, 1990, 1992, 1994, 1995, 1996, 1997, 1998, 1999, 2000, 2014
 Danube League
 Winner (2): 2019, 2022

References

External links
Official website 

Water polo clubs in Hungary
LEN Women's Champions' Cup clubs